Mararía is a 1998 drama film directed by Antonio José Betancor consisting of an adaptation of the 1973 novel Mararía by Rafael Arozarena which stars Goya Toledo as the title character alongside Carmelo Gómez, Iain Glen, Mirtha Ibarra and José Manuel Cervino. It was produced by companies from Spain, France, and Portugal.

Plot 
Set in 1930s Lanzarote (the easternmost of the Canary Islands), the plot tracks an English vulcanologist and a Basque physician vying for the love of Mararía, a local Canarian woman.

Cast

Production 
The screenplay is an adaptation of the 1973 novel Mararía by Rafael Arozarena, featuring substantial changes from the original work, such as the reduction in the number of males courting the character Mararía to 2, the characters portrayed by Gómez and Glen, the latter of which is an amalgamation of two characters from the novel.

Release 
Distributed by Alta Films, the film was theatrically released in Spain on 30 October 1998.

Reception 
Jonathan Holland of Variety considered the "terrifically lensed" film to be "a good old-fashioned melodrama" that manages to have enough "intelligent idiosyncrasy" to give it its own "power and charm".

Accolades 

|-
| align = "center" rowspan = "5" | 1999 || rowspan = "5" | 13th Goya Awards || Best Adapted Screenplay || Antonio Betancor, Carlos Álvarez ||  || rowspan = "5" | 
|-
| Best New Actress || Goya Toledo || 
|-
| Best Cinematography || Juan Antonio Ruiz Anchía || 
|-
| Best Original Score || Pedro Guerra || 
|-
| Best Art Direction || Félix Murcia || 
|}

See also 
 List of Spanish films of 1998

References 

Films set in the 1930s
Films set in the Canary Islands
Films based on Spanish novels
1990s Spanish-language films
Spanish romantic drama films
French romantic drama films
Portuguese romantic drama films
1998 romantic drama films
Lanzarote in fiction
1990s French films
1990s Spanish films